Two-Gun Gussie is a 1918 American short comedy film featuring Harold Lloyd.

Plot
Gussie (Harold Lloyd) is a mild-mannered easterner who finds employment as a piano player in a rowdy western saloon.  Dagger-Tooth Dan, the toughest character in town, sees two letters the local sheriff has received.  One includes a picture of him, from another western sheriff, with a warning that Dan is a violent menace.  The other letter contains a photo of Gussie and a check from his father, asking the sheriff to gave the check to Gussie.  Dan switches the photos in the envelopes so that he receives Gussie's check.  Furthermore, the sheriff now believes that Gussie is a violent gunman.  Within a short time, the entire town is scared of Gussie's reputation.  Gussie himself starts to believe he is a tough guy.  Inevitably, Gussie clashes with Dagger-Tooth Dan.

Cast
 Harold Lloyd as Two-Gun Gussie (Harold)
 Snub Pollard as Snub (credited as Harry Pollard)
 Bebe Daniels as The Girl
 William Blaisdell as Dagger-Tooth Dan
 Charles Stevenson as Whooping-Cough Charlie, the Sheriff
 Sammy Brooks (uncredited)
 Billy Fay (uncredited)
 William Gillespie as Angry bar patron (uncredited)
 Helen Gilmore (uncredited)
 Lew Harvey (uncredited)
 Wallace Howe (uncredited)
 Bud Jamison (uncredited)
 Gus Leonard as Conservatory listener / bar patron (uncredited)
 Fred C. Newmeyer (uncredited)
 James Parrott (uncredited)
 Dorothea Wolbert as An Admirer (uncredited)

Reception
Like many American films of the time, Two-Gun Gussie was subject to restrictions and cuts by city and state film censorship boards. For example, the Chicago Board of Censors cut the vulgar action of a man after being shot in the posterior.

See also
 Harold Lloyd filmography

References

External links

 Two-Gun Gussie on YouTube

1918 films
1918 comedy films
1918 short films
Silent American comedy films
American silent short films
American black-and-white films
Films directed by Alfred J. Goulding
Films with screenplays by H. M. Walker
American comedy short films
1910s American films
1910s English-language films